Parenchyma is the bulk of functional substance in an animal organ or structure such as a tumour. In zoology it is the name for the tissue that fills the interior of flatworms.

Etymology
The term parenchyma is New Latin from the  word παρέγχυμα  parenchyma meaning 'visceral flesh', and from παρεγχεῖν parenkhein meaning 'to pour in' from παρα- para- 'beside' + ἐν en- 'in' + χεῖν khein 'to pour'.

Originally, Erasistratus and other anatomists used it to refer to certain human tissues. Later, it was also applied to plant tissues by Nehemiah Grew.

Structure
The parenchyma is the functional parts of an organ, or of a structure such as a tumour in the body. This is in contrast to the stroma, which refers to the structural tissue of organs or of structures, namely, the connective tissues.

Brain
The brain parenchyma refers to the functional tissue in the brain that is made up of the two types of brain cell, neurons and glial cells. It is also known to contain collagen proteins. Damage or trauma to the brain parenchyma often results in a loss of cognitive ability or even death. Bleeding into the parenchyma is known as  intraparenchymal hemorrhage.

Lungs

Lung parenchyma is the substance of the lung that is involved with gas exchange and includes the pulmonary alveoli.

Liver
The liver parenchyma is the functional tissue of the organ made up of around 80% of the liver volume as hepatocytes. The other main type of liver cells are non-parenchymal. Non-parenchymal cells constitute 40% of the total number of liver cells but only 6.5% of its volume.

Kidneys
The renal parenchyma is divided into two major structures: the outer renal cortex and the inner renal medulla. Grossly, these structures take the shape of 7 to 18 cone-shaped renal lobes, each containing renal cortex surrounding a portion of medulla called a renal pyramid.

Tumors
The tumor parenchyma, of a solid tumour, is one of the two distinct compartments in a solid tumour. The parenchyma is made up of neoplastic cells. The other compartment is the stroma induced by the neoplastic cells, needed for nutritional support and waste removal. In many types of tumour, clusters of parenchymal cells are separated by a basal lamina that can sometimes be incomplete.

Flatworms
Parenchyma is the tissue made up of cells and intercellular spaces that fills the interior of the body of a flatworm, which is an acoelomate. This is a spongy tissue also known as a mesenchymal tissue, in which several types of cells are lodged in their extracellular matrices. The parenchymal cells include myocytes, and many types of specialised cells. The cells are often attached to each other and also to their nearby epithelial cells mainly by gap junctions and hemidesmosomes. There is much variation in the types of cell in the parenchyma according to the species and anatomical regions. Its possible functions may include skeletal support, nutrient storage, movement, and many others.

References

External links 
 

Tissues (biology)